Bacoli is a comune (municipality) in the Metropolitan City of Naples in the Italian region Campania, located about  west of Naples.

Geography
Bacoli borders the municipalities of Monte di Procida and Pozzuoli.

Its territory, of volcanic origin, is part of the Phlegraean Fields. The volcano of Cape Miseno and the Miseno port date from c. 35,000-10,500 years ago.

History

Bacoli was founded by the ancient Romans in the 2nd or 1st c. BC, who called it Bauli. In Roman times it was a popular resort almost as famous as the nearby Baiae. Many luxurious villas were built on the coast there and on the headland. Symmachus said of Bauli in the late 4th c. AD:

Main sights

Several major ancient Roman structures can be seen in Bacoli, including the Piscina Mirabilis, the Cento Camerelle, and the so-called Tomba Agrippina, a theatre belonging to an ancient villa.

The frazione of Cuma - Fusaro includes the site of Cumae, the first settlement in Italy by the ancient Greeks.

The archaeological remains of Baiae are also located in the comune.

The frazione of Miliscola (from the Latin militum schola) was, in the Roman Empire, the seat of a military school.

Twin towns
 Kymi, Greece, since  1983
 Marche region, Italy, since 2001 
 Kobani, Syria, since 2015

References

External links

 Official website

 
Cities and towns in Campania
Coastal towns in Campania
Municipalities of the Metropolitan City of Naples